Jenna Wang or Wang Szu-ping is a Taiwanese actress.

Filmography

Television series

Films 
 Gangster Rock (2010)
 War Game 229 (2011)
 Open! Open! (2015)
 Oh, Pretty Woman (2018)

References

External links

 
 

1987 births
21st-century Taiwanese actresses
Actresses from Taipei
Living people